Many projects have attempted to use the Gnutella network, since its introduction in early 2000.  This list enumerates abandoned or discontinued projects.

List of discontinued clients

List of former gnutella clients 
Software that still work but dropped the GNUtella protocol.

Additional information

Mutella 

 Developers - Max Zaitsev, Gregory Block
 Operating system - UNIX
 Latest release version - 0.4.5
 Genre - peer-to-peer
 License - gpl
 Website - Mutella development site

Mutella was a Gnutella client developed by Max Zaitsev and Gregory Block. It had two user interfaces, one for textmode use and another called remote control, which ran on an integrated web server and was used by a web browser. The first public version of Mutella was published on October 6, 2001.

The Mutella logo was changed into a squid somewhere around version 4.1. Before this change the logo used to be an Ouroboros. There was a blue and a black version of the ouroboros logo.

SwapNut 
Slashdot reports that LimeWire and SwapNut used the same code.  The website was www.swapnut.com.

XoloX 
XoloX  was a Gnutella-based peer-to-peer file sharing application for Windows. It advertised having no spyware, adware, or hijackware. However, upon installation, it prompted the user to install programs suspected to be of that kind.  Also, Microsoft Anti-Spyware detected adware programs when you started to install the program.

XoloX links
 www.xolox.nl was the Official Website. Dead since June 2007.
Review: Xolox

See also
 Abandonware
 Comparison of Gnutella software

References 
 Discontinued Gnutella Clients

Gnutella clients
Gnutella clients, historical